The Engineering Council of South Africa (ECSA) is the statutory body for engineering profession in South Africa. Its functions are to accredit the engineering programs and to register the engineering professionals in specified categories throughout the country.

Overview
It was established in terms of the Engineering Profession Act 2000 (Act No. 46 of 2000), although its history dates to the South African Council for Professional Engineers (SACPE) in 1969.

Professional Titles 
The council regulates the practice of engineering, including titles as follows:

 Professional Engineer (Pr Eng)
 Professional Engineering Technologist (Pr Tech Eng)
 Professional Certificated Engineer (Pr Cert Eng)
 Professional Engineering Technician (Pr Eng Techni)

Identification of Work 
The council has been working towards a regulated industry for several years and is going towards implementation by March 2024. The Identification of Engineering Work (IDoEW). The regulation did have several challenges in the past including the Competition Commission.

The full implementation started in March 2021 with a 3 year implementation period, all the engineering practitioners needs to be registered by March 2024.

The CEO of the Council for the Built Environment, Dr Msizi Myeza has issued a response also in this regard, "illegal for the non-registered persons to administer and lead infrastructure projects in South Africa". The letter is board as it goes beyond ECSA and includes all other disciplines within the environment.

Accreditation
Signatories of the following international education agreements have agreed to recognize educational programs that are accredited by ECSA:

 Washington Accord (since 1999) and recognition of BEng Degree Programs.
 Sydney Accord (since 2001) and recognition of BTech Degree Programs.
 Dublin Accord (since 2002) and recognition of National Diploma Programs.

References

External links
ECSA official website

Professional certification in engineering
Engineering societies based in South Africa